This is a list of members of the Western Australian Legislative Assembly between the 1911 election and the 1914 election, together known as the Eighth Parliament. All members who sat as Liberals, apart from those returned at by-elections, were elected under the "Ministerial" designation at the 1911 election.

Notes
 Following the 1911 state election a new Ministry consisting of six members, including one Member of the Legislative Council, was appointed. These members were therefore required to resign and contest ministerial by-elections on 17 October 1911, at which all were returned unopposed.
 Peter O'Loghlen, the Labor member for Forrest, resigned his seat on 17 April 1913 to contest the seat of Swan at the 1913 federal election on 31 May. Thomas Moore, the Labor candidate, was elected unopposed on 6 May 1913, but resigned on 17 June before being sworn in. O'Loghlen contested a second by-election for Forrest on 3 July 1913, at which he was successful.
 Edward Heitmann, the Labor member for Cue, resigned on 4 November 1913 in order to contest the Geraldton by-election. Thomas Chesson, the Labor candidate, was elected unopposed on 12 November 1913 to fill the vacancy.
 Bronte Dooley, the Labor member for Geraldton, died on 19 October 1913. A by-election was called for 15 November 1913 in the seat, at which Edward Heitmann, who had resigned his seat of Cue to contest the by-election, was defeated on a 12-vote margin by Samuel Elliott of the Liberal Party.
 Albert Green, the Labor member for Kalgoorlie, resigned on 8 December 1913. The Labor candidate, George McLeod, won the by-election held to fill the vacancy on 4 February 1914. McLeod retired at the general election held on 21 October 1914 to enable Green to regain the seat.
 With the formation of the Country Party in August 1913, two Members of the Legislative Assembly, Charles Layman (Nelson) and Alfred Piesse (Toodyay), switched their allegiance from the Liberals to the new party prior to the 1914 election, at which they retained their seats as Country Party members.

Sources
 
 
 
 Western Australian Government Gazettes for 1911–1914; Indexed under "Electoral". Note esp. 

Members of Western Australian parliaments by term